The Politics of Anti-Semitism is a book edited by Alexander Cockburn and Jeffrey St. Clair, and published by AK Press in 2003.

Contributors include former U.S. Representative Cynthia McKinney, British foreign correspondent Robert Fisk, former senior CIA analysts Bill and Kathy Christison, professor of philosophy Michael Neumann, Capitol Hill staffer George Sutherland, assistant professor of political science and author Norman Finkelstein, Israeli Uri Avnery, Shaheed Alam and Israeli journalists Neve Gordon and Yigal Bronner as well as Will Yeoman, Kurt Nimmo and Anne Pettifer. The editors Alexander Cockburn and Jeffrey St. Clair allege "false accusations of antisemitism are used to silence Israel's critics." They also write about the USS Liberty incident.

References

Israeli–Palestinian conflict books
Books about antisemitism
AK Press books